Elsa Katrine Hattestad (née Solberg; born 18 April 1966) is a retired Norwegian track and field athlete who competed in the javelin throw. During her career, she was a European, World, and Olympic Champion, and broke the world record twice. Her personal best, set in 2000, of 69.48 m is the Norwegian record. It also ranks her fifth on the overall list.

Career
Hattestad made her international debut at the 1981 European Junior Championships, finishing fifth. The following year, at the age of just 16, she competed in the European Championships for seniors. By the beginning of the 1990s, Hattestad was one of the best female javelin throwers in the world. In 1993, she won her first major international title, the World Championships in Stuttgart as well as the IAAF Golden Four. To that, she added the 1994 European title. At the 1996 Atlanta Olympic Games, she won the bronze medal. The following year, she regained the World Championships. At the 1999 World Championships, she lost the title again, finishing third, but in 2000 she won the only title missing in her career with a gold medal at the Olympic Games in Sydney.

Personal life
In her youth, she was a promising handball player in her country, playing for a club in the second tier of the Norwegian league system.

She has four children with her former husband Anders Hattestad. They divorced in 2017.

Competition record
*All results with the old model javelin unless noted.

References

External links
 

 
 

 
 

 
 

 
 

 
 

 
 

1966 births
Living people
Olympic athletes of Norway
Athletes (track and field) at the 1984 Summer Olympics
Athletes (track and field) at the 1988 Summer Olympics
Athletes (track and field) at the 1992 Summer Olympics
Athletes (track and field) at the 1996 Summer Olympics
Athletes (track and field) at the 2000 Summer Olympics
Olympic gold medalists for Norway
Olympic bronze medalists for Norway
People from Lørenskog
Norwegian female javelin throwers
World Athletics Championships athletes for Norway
World Athletics Championships medalists
European Athletics Championships medalists
Medalists at the 2000 Summer Olympics
Medalists at the 1996 Summer Olympics
Olympic gold medalists in athletics (track and field)
Olympic bronze medalists in athletics (track and field)
Goodwill Games medalists in athletics
IAAF Golden League winners
European Athlete of the Year winners
World Athletics Championships winners
Competitors at the 1994 Goodwill Games
Sportspeople from Viken (county)